The 1925 Yale Bulldogs football team was an American football team that represented Yale University as an independent during the 1925 college football season. In its eighth season under head coach Tad Jones, the team compiled a 5–2–1 record and outscored opponents by a total of 204 to 76.

Yale guard Herbert Sturhahn was named a first-team player on the 1925 College Football All-America Teams selected by the Associated Press, Collier's Weekly, the All-America Board (made up of Tad Jones of Yale, Knute Rockne of Notre Dame and Glenn Scobey Warner of Stanford), and the New York Sun. Sturhahn was also later inducted into the College Football Hall of Fame.  Yale tackle Johnny Joss was also named a first-team All-American for 1925 by the New York Sun.

Schedule

References

Yale
Yale Bulldogs football seasons
Yale Bulldogs football